Kai Miki (三鬼 海, born 19 April 1993) is a Japanese football player for FC Machida Zelvia.

Career statistics

Club
Updated to end of 2018 season.

1Includes Emperor's Cup.
2Includes J2/J3 Playoffs.

References

External links
Profile at Montedio Yamagata
Profile at Roasso Kumamoto

1993 births
Living people
Association football people from Mie Prefecture
Japanese footballers
J2 League players
J3 League players
Japan Football League players
FC Machida Zelvia players
V-Varen Nagasaki players
Roasso Kumamoto players
Montedio Yamagata players
Association football midfielders